A Real Girl is a 1929 American silent film directed by Ralph Ince and starring Sally O'Neil, Donald Reed and Lilyan Tashman. It is also known by the alternative title of Hardboiled.

Cast
 Sally O'Neil as Teena Johnson 
 Donald Reed as Kyle Stannard 
 Lilyan Tashman as Minnie  
 Bob Sinclair as Scotty  
 Ole M. Ness as Warren Kennedy 
 Tom O'Grady as Jerry

References

Bibliography
 Quinlan, David. The Illustrated Guide to Film Directors. Batsford, 1983.

External links

1929 films
Films directed by Ralph Ince
American silent feature films
1920s English-language films
American black-and-white films
Film Booking Offices of America films
1920s American films